The states and territories are federated administrative divisions in Australia, ruled by regional governments that constitute the second level of governance between the federal government and local governments. States are self-governing polities with incomplete sovereignty (having ceded some sovereign rights to federation) and have their own constitutions, legislatures, departments, and certain civil authorities (e.g. judiciary and law enforcement) that administer and deliver most public policies and programs. Territories can be autonomous and administer local policies and programs much like the states in practice, but are still constitutionally and financially subordinate to the federal government and thus have no true sovereignty.

The Commonwealth of Australia constitutionally consists of six federated states (New South Wales, Queensland, South Australia, Tasmania, Victoria, and Western Australia) and ten federal territories, out of which three are internal territories (the Australian Capital Territory, the Jervis Bay Territory, and the Northern Territory) contiguous to the Australian mainland; and the other seven are external territories (Ashmore and Cartier Islands, the Australian Antarctic Territory, Christmas Island, the Cocos (Keeling) Islands, the Coral Sea Islands, Heard Island and McDonald Islands, and Norfolk Island), which are offshore dependent territories. Every state and internal territory (except the Jervis Bay Territory) is self-governing with its own independent executive government, legislative branch, and judicial system, while the rest only have local government status overseen by federal departments.

State and territory governments have executive authority to legislate on matters concerning their citizens, subject to the limits of the federal constitution (notably section 51 and section 109). Each state and internal territory (except Jervis Bay Territory) has its own legislature, although the federal government can override any territorial legislation. The federal High Court of Australia acts as a final court of appeal for all matters and has the authority to override any state judiciary. While all states and internal territories have their own judicial system, which is subject to appeal to the High Court, most external territories are subject to the judiciary and legislature of either a state or internal territory. Excluding the Heard Island and McDonald Islands and the Australian Antarctic Territory (which are governed by the Department of Agriculture, Water and the Environment), the external territories are governed by the federal Department of Infrastructure, Transport, Regional Development and Communications. Norfolk Island had its own legislature from 1979 to 2015.

Each state of Australia is a successor to historical British colonies, and each has its own state or territorial constitution. The Australian Capital Territory (ACT) and Northern Territory for the most part operate indistinguishably from the states, even though they do not have constitutional status as states, and territorial legislations can be overridden.

Geography 

Surrounded by the Indian, Pacific, and Southern oceans, Australia is separated from Maritime Southeast Asia and New Guinea by the Arafura Sea, Timor Sea, and Torres Strait, from the Melanesian islands by the Coral Sea, and from New Zealand by the Tasman Sea. The world's smallest continent, Australia is also the sixth largest country by land area and sometimes considered the world's largest island.

Borders 

 New South Wales borders
 Victorian borders
 Queensland borders
 Western Australia border
 South Australian borders
 Tasmanian borders
 Australian Capital Territory border
 Northern Territory borders

States and territories 

At Federation in 1901, what is now the Northern Territory was within South Australia, what are now the Australian Capital Territory and Jervis Bay Territory were within New South Wales, and Coral Sea Islands was part of Queensland. Ashmore and Cartier Islands was accepted by Australia in 1934 and was annexed to the Northern Territory prior to adoption of the Statute of Westminster in 1942, deemed effective from 1939; it has thus become part of Australia.

States

Territories

Internal territories

External territories

Each external territory is regulated by an Act of the federal Parliament. These Acts contain the majority of provisions determining the legal and political structure applying in that external territory. Under s 122 of the Australian Constitution the federal Parliament has plenary power to make laws for all territories including all external territories.

The Cocos (Keeling) Islands voted for  integration in 1984. Together with Christmas Island, these two territories comprise the Australian Indian Ocean Territories. Commonwealth laws apply automatically to the territories unless expressly stated otherwise and residents of both external territories are associated with Northern Territory for federal elections. They are, thus, constitutionally part of Australia.

The Heard Island and McDonald Islands, although uninhabited, are treated as constitutionally part of Australia by the central government.

Norfolk Island's status is controversial, with the present government taking measures to integrate the territory into Australia proper (including representation in parliament and compulsory voting). The Norfolk Islanders have not formally consented to this change in constitutional status and assert that they are not Australian.

Notes

Former territories

Internal 
Two internal territories established by the Australian federal government under Section 122 of the Constitution of Australia no longer exist:

Central Australia (1926–1931), consisting of the area of the current Northern Territory south of the 20th parallel south
North Australia (1926–1931), consisting of the area of the current Northern Territory north of the 20th parallel south

External 
Two present-day Oceanic countries, Papua New Guinea (PNG) and Nauru, were administered by the federal government of Australia as de facto or de jure external territories for differing periods between 1902 and 1975.

Papua and New Guinea (1883–1949) 
Territory of Papua:
 1883–1902: A de facto part of Queensland (de jure British territory in 1888–1900)
 1902–1949: An external territory of Australia
Territory of New Guinea: 1920–1949, under a League of Nations mandate. The territory was previously known as German New Guinea between 1884 and 1914; it was formally under Australian military occupation in 1914–1920).

Following World War II, the Papua and New Guinea Act 1949 placed the Territory of New Guinea in an "administrative union" with the Territory of Papua, and the combined Territory of Papua and New Guinea was created. However, both territories remained technically distinct for some administrative and legal purposes, until 1975, when the combined entity eventually was given independence as Papua New Guinea.

Nauru (1920–1968)
Nauru was previously under the German colonial empire as part of the German New Guinea.  Following World War I, the Australian government received a League of Nations mandate for Nauru. After World War II, the Territory of Papua, Territory of New Guinea and Nauru were all controlled by the Australian government as United Nations trust territories. Nauru was granted independence in 1968.

Statistics 
The majority of Australians live in the eastern coastal mainland states of New South Wales, Queensland, Victoria, and the Australian Capital Territory, which collectively forms 79% of the entire population of Australia (more than three-quarters of all Australians). Most of the major population centres are located east and south of the Great Dividing Range on the coastal plains and their associated hinterland regions.

Statistical divisions 
The Australian Bureau of Statistics' (ABS) Australian Statistical Geography Standard describes several main statistical divisions of Australia:

 Mesh Block (MB) – the smallest area of division, MBs are rarely used for statistics and represent 3060 dwellings, though some have no population or development. They are conventionally used as a way to ensure confidentiality of responses.
 Statistical Area Level 1 (SA1) – SA1s are small areas of 200800 people and are used to balance spatial detail and cross comparison in the Census of Population and Housing.
 Statistical Area Level 2 (SA2) – SA2s are designed to represent financial and social interactions, such as a suburb or neighbourhood of 3,00025,000 people (averaging at 10,000) and is often the smallest division used in statistical releases.
 Statistical Area Level 3 (SA3) – SA3s are regional representations of local communities, generally containing similar characteristics, administrative boundaries, and labour markets, each having 30,000130,000 people.
 Statistical Area Level 4 (SA4) – SA4s are broader representations of labour forces in population centres, with 100,000300,000 people in regional areas and 300,000500,000 in metropolitan areas.
 States and Territories

The ABS also defines other divisions such as the Greater Capital City Statistical Area Structure, Significant Urban Area Structure, Remoteness Structure, and Indigenous Structure. Other non-ABS divisions include Local Government Areas, Postal Areas, electoral divisions, and tourism regions.

Background and overview 

The states originated as separate British colonies prior to Federation in 1901. The Colony of New South Wales was founded in 1788 and originally comprised much of the Australian mainland, as well as Lord Howe Island, New Zealand, Norfolk Island, and Van Diemen's Land, in addition to the area currently referred to as the state of New South Wales. During the 19th century, large areas were successively separated to form the Colony of Tasmania (initially established as a separate colony named Van Diemen's Land in 1825), the Colony of Western Australia (initially established as the smaller Swan River Colony in 1829), the Province of South Australia (1836), the Colony of New Zealand (1840), the Victoria Colony (1851) and the Colony of Queensland (1859). Upon federation, the six colonies of New South Wales, Victoria, Queensland, South Australia, Western Australia, and Tasmania became the founding states of the new Commonwealth of Australia.

The legislative powers of the states are protected by the Australian constitution, section 107, and under the principle of federalism, Commonwealth legislation only applies to the states where permitted by the constitution. The territories, by contrast, are from a constitutional perspective directly subject to the Commonwealth government; laws for territories are determined by the Australian Parliament.

Most of the territories are directly administered by the Commonwealth government, while two (the Northern Territory and the Australian Capital Territory) have some degree of self-government although less than that of the states. In the self-governing territories, the Australian Parliament retains the full power to legislate, and can override laws made by the territorial institutions, which it has done on rare occasions. For the purposes of Australian (and joint Australia-New Zealand) intergovernmental bodies, the Northern Territory and the Australian Capital Territory are treated as if they were states.

Each state has a governor, appointed by the monarch (currently King Charles III), which by convention he does on the advice of the state premier. The Administrator of the Northern Territory, by contrast, is appointed by the governor-general. The Australian Capital Territory has neither a governor nor an administrator, but the governor-general exercises some powers that in other jurisdictions are exercised by the governor of a state or administrator of a territory, such as the power to dissolve the Legislative Assembly.

Jervis Bay Territory is the only non-self-governing internal territory. Until 1989, it was administered as if it were a part of the ACT, although it has always been a separate territory. Under the terms of the Jervis Bay Territory Acceptance Act 1915, the laws of the ACT apply to the Jervis Bay Territory insofar as they are applicable and providing they are not inconsistent with an ordinance. Although residents of the Jervis Bay Territory are generally subject to laws made by the ACT Legislative Assembly, they are not represented in the assembly. They are represented in the Parliament of Australia as part of the Electoral Division of Fenner (named the Division of Fraser until 2016) in the ACT and by the ACT's two senators. In other respects, the territory is administered directly by the Federal Government through the Territories portfolio.

The external territory of Norfolk Island possessed a degree of self-government from 1979 until 2015.

Each state has a bicameral parliament, except Queensland, which abolished its upper house in 1922. The lower house is called the "legislative assembly", except in South Australia and Tasmania, where it is called the "house of assembly". Tasmania is the only state to use proportional representation for elections to its lower house; all others elect members from single member constituencies, using preferential voting. The upper house is called the "legislative council" and is generally elected from multi-member constituencies using proportional representation. The three self-governing territories, the ACT, the Northern Territory, and Norfolk Island, each have unicameral legislative assemblies.

The head of government of each state is called the "premier", appointed by the state's governor. In normal circumstances, the governor will appoint as premier whoever leads the party or coalition which exercises control of the lower house (in the case of Queensland, the only house) of the state parliament. However, in times of constitutional crisis, the governor can appoint someone else as premier. The head of government of the self-governing internal territories is called the "chief minister". The Northern Territory's chief minister, in normal circumstances whoever controls the legislative assembly, is appointed by the administrator.

The term interstate is used within Australia to refer to a number of events, transactions, registrations, travel, etc. which occurs across borders or outside of the particular state or territory of the user of the term. Examples of use include motor vehicle registration, travel, applications to educational institutions out of one's home state.

There are very few urban areas bifurcated by state or territory borders. The Queensland-New South Wales border runs through Coolangatta (Queensland) and Tweed Heads (New South Wales) and splits Gold Coast Airport.  Oaks Estate, a contiguous residential of Queanbeyan, was excised out of New South Wales when the Australian Capital Territory was established in 1909.  Some Urban Centres and Localities reported by the Australian Bureau of Statistics include some agglomerations of cities spreading across state borders, including Gold Coast–Tweed Heads, Canberra–Queanbeyan, Albury–Wodonga (New South Wales-Victoria) and Mildura–Wentworth (Victoria-New South Wales)

Timeline 
1788 – British Empire establishes the Colony of New South Wales across central and eastern mainland Australia, the island of Tasmania, both islands of New Zealand and Norfolk Island.
1803 – The Coral Sea Islands are claimed by New South Wales.
1825 – The island of Tasmania becomes the independent colony of Van Diemen's Land. New South Wales extends its borders further west in mainland Australia.
1829 – The British Empire establishes the Swan River Colony in western mainland Australia.
1832 – Swan River Colony is renamed the "colony of Western Australia".
1836 – The Colony of South Australia is established.
1841 – The islands of New Zealand become the independent colony of New Zealand. Much of eastern Antarctica is annexed by Britain as Victoria Land.
1844 – New South Wales transfers Norfolk Island to Van Diemen's Land.
1846 – Northern central and eastern Australia briefly become the independent Colony of North Australia, then are returned to New South Wales.
1851 – Southeastern mainland Australia becomes the independent colony of Victoria.
1856 – Van Diemen's Land is renamed the colony of Tasmania. Norfolk Island becomes the independent colony of Norfolk Island, however it is to be administered by the same governor as New South Wales.
1857 – Much of southern central mainland Australia becomes the independent colony of South Australia. The Cocos (Keeling) Islands are annexed by Britain.
1859 – Northeastern mainland Australia and Coral Sea Islands become the independent colony of Queensland.
1860 – A pocket of New South Wales territory remaining in southern central mainland Australia is transferred to South Australia.
1862 – Some of New South Wales' northern central mainland Australian territory is transferred to Queensland.
1863 – New South Wales' remaining northern central mainland Australian territory is transferred to South Australia.
1878 – Britain annexes Ashmore Island.
1883 – Queensland annexes southeastern New Guinea.
1884 – Southeastern New Guinea becomes the independent Territory of Papua.
1886 – The Cocos (Keeling) Islands are to be administered by the same governor as the Straits Settlements.
1888 – Christmas Island is annexed by Britain and incorporated into the Straits Settlements.
1897 – Norfolk Island is officially reintegrated into New South Wales.
1901 – New South Wales, Queensland, Tasmania, Western Australia, Victoria and South Australia federate into the Commonwealth of Australia. Queensland transfers the Coral Sea Islands to the federal government, creating a federal external territory.
1902 – Britain transfers Papua to Australia as an external territory.
1903 – The Cocos (Keeling) Islands are incorporated into the Straits Settlements.
1909 – Britain annexes Cartier Island.
1910 – Britain claims Heard Island and the McDonald Islands.
1911 – The state of South Australia transfers control of northern central mainland Australia to the federal government, creating the Northern Territory. A small pocket of New South Wales around the city of Canberra is transferred to the federal government (who are seated within it), creating the Federal Capital Territory.
1913 – New South Wales transfers Norfolk Island to the federal government, making it a federal external territory.
1915 – A small pocket of New South Wales around Jervis Bay is transferred to the federal government and incorporated into the Federal Capital Territory.
1920 – Following the defeat of the German Empire in World War I, the League of Nations establishes an Australian mandate in northeastern New Guinea, it becomes the external Territory of New Guinea.
1923 – Another conquered German territory, the island of Nauru, is established as an Australian mandate and external territory by the League of Nations, this time as a co-mandate with Britain and New Zealand.
1927 – The Northern Territory is split into two territories – North Australia and Central Australia.
1930 – The remaining territory in eastern Antarctica is annexed by Britain as Enderby Land.
1931 – North Australia and Central Australia are reincorporated as the Northern Territory. Britain recognises Australia as possessors of the uninhabited Ashmore and Cartier Islands, making them an external federal territory.
1933 – Britain transfers Victoria Land and Enderby Land to Australia, creating the Australian Antarctic Territory, with ongoing limited international recognition.
1938 – The Federal Capital Territory is renamed the "Australian Capital Territory".
1942 – The Japanese Empire conquers Nauru from Australia, Britain and New Zealand as part of World War II. Japan also conquers much of the Straits Settlements, including Christmas Island. The Cocos (Keeling) Islands are not conquered and are transferred to the Colony of Ceylon.
1946 – The United Nations, the successor to the League of Nations, renews its mandate of New Guinea to Australia.
1947 – Following the defeat of Japan in World War II, the United Nations returns Nauru to Australia, Britain and New Zealand as a joint mandate. Christmas Island returns to Britain and is incorporated into the Colony of Singapore. The Cocos (Keeling) Islands are also transferred to Singapore.
1949 – Papua and New Guinea are incorporated into the singular Territory of Papua and New Guinea. Britain transfers Heard Island and the McDonald Islands to Australia, creating a federal external territory.
1955 – Britain transfers the Cocos (Keeling) Islands to Australia, they become an external territory.
1958 – Britain transfers Christmas Island to Australia, it becomes an external territory.
1966 – The Republic of Nauru is established, ending Australian-British-New Zealander control of the island.
1975 – Papua and New Guinea becomes the Independent State of Papua New Guinea, ending British-Australian control.
1978 – Northern Territory gains self-government with certain Commonwealth control.
1979 – Norfolk Island gains self-government with certain Commonwealth control.
1989 – The Australian Capital Territory gains self-government with certain Commonwealth control. Jervis Bay becomes independent of the ACT, becoming the Jervis Bay Territory.
2015 – Norfolk Island loses self-government with full Commonwealth control.

Comparative terminology

Politics

Governors and administrators

Premiers and chief ministers

Parliaments 

 Parliament of New South Wales
 Parliament of Victoria
 Parliament of Queensland
 Parliament of Western Australia
 Parliament of South Australia
 Parliament of Tasmania
 Australian Capital Territory Legislative Assembly
 Northern Territory Legislative Assembly

Supreme courts

 Supreme Court of New South Wales
 Supreme Court of Victoria
 Supreme Court of Queensland
 Supreme Court of Western Australia
 Supreme Court of South Australia
 Supreme Court of Tasmania
 Supreme Court of the Australian Capital Territory
 Supreme Court of the Northern Territory
 Supreme Court of Norfolk Island

Police forces

New South Wales Police Force
Victoria Police
Queensland Police Service
Western Australia Police Force
South Australia Police
Tasmania Police
Australian Capital Territory Policing (performed by Australian Federal Police)
Northern Territory Police Force
Law enforcement in Norfolk Island, also provided by Australian Federal Police

State and territory codes

See also 

 Australian regional rivalries
 ISO 3166-2:AU, the ISO codes for the states and territories of Australia.
 List of Australian demonyms
 List of Australian states by Human Development Index
 List of proposed states of Australia

Notes

References 

 
Australia geography-related lists
Australia 1
States, Australia
States and territories
Subdivisions of Australia